This is a list of electoral division results for the Australian 1998 federal election in the state of New South Wales.

Overall results

Results by division

Banks 
 This section is an excerpt from Electoral results for the Division of Banks § 1998

Barton 
 This section is an excerpt from Electoral results for the Division of Barton § 1998

Bennelong 
 This section is an excerpt from Electoral results for the Division of Bennelong § 1998

Berowra 
 This section is an excerpt from Electoral results for the Division of Berowra § 1998

Blaxland 
 This section is an excerpt from Electoral results for the Division of Blaxland § 1998

Bradfield 
 This section is an excerpt from Electoral results for the Division of Bradfield § 1998

Calare 
 This section is an excerpt from Electoral results for the Division of Calare § 1998

Charlton 
 This section is an excerpt from Electoral results for the Division of Charlton § 1998

Chifley 
 This section is an excerpt from Electoral results for the Division of Chifley § 1998

Cook 
 This section is an excerpt from Electoral results for the Division of Cook § 1998

Cowper 
 This section is an excerpt from Electoral results for the Division of Cowper § 1998

Cunningham 
 This section is an excerpt from Electoral results for the Division of Cunningham § 1998

Dobell 
 This section is an excerpt from Electoral results for the Division of Dobell § 1998

Eden-Monaro 
 This section is an excerpt from Electoral results for the Division of Eden-Monaro § 1998

Farrer 
 This section is an excerpt from Electoral results for the Division of Farrer § 1998

Fowler 
 This section is an excerpt from Electoral results for the Division of Fowler § 1998

Gilmore 
 This section is an excerpt from Electoral results for the Division of Gilmore § 1998

Grayndler 
 This section is an excerpt from Electoral results for the Division of Grayndler § 1998

Greenway 
 This section is an excerpt from Electoral results for the Division of Greenway § 1998

Gwydir 
 This section is an excerpt from Electoral results for the Division of Gwydir § 1998

Hughes 
 This section is an excerpt from Electoral results for the Division of Hughes § 1998

Hume 
 This section is an excerpt from Electoral results for the Division of Hume § 1998

Hunter 
 This section is an excerpt from Electoral results for the Division of Hunter § 1998

Kingsford Smith 
 This section is an excerpt from Electoral results for the Division of Kingsford Smith § 1998

Lindsay 
 This section is an excerpt from Electoral results for the Division of Lindsay § 1998

Lowe 
 This section is an excerpt from Electoral results for the Division of Lowe § 1998

Lyne 
 This section is an excerpt from Electoral results for the Division of Lyne § 1998

Macarthur 
 This section is an excerpt from Electoral results for the Division of Macarthur § 1998

Mackellar 
 This section is an excerpt from Electoral results for the Division of Mackellar § 1998

Macquarie 
 This section is an excerpt from Electoral results for the Division of Macquarie § 1998

Mitchell 
 This section is an excerpt from Electoral results for the Division of Mitchell § 1998

New England 
 This section is an excerpt from Electoral results for the Division of New England § 1998

Newcastle 
 This section is an excerpt from Electoral results for the Division of Newcastle § 1998

North Sydney 
 This section is an excerpt from Electoral results for the Division of North Sydney § 1998

Page 
 This section is an excerpt from Electoral results for the Division of Page § 1998

Parkes 
 This section is an excerpt from Electoral results for the Division of Parkes § 1998

Parramatta 
 This section is an excerpt from Electoral results for the Division of Parramatta § 1998

Paterson 
 This section is an excerpt from Electoral results for the Division of Paterson § 1998

Prospect 
 This section is an excerpt from Electoral results for the Division of Prospect § 1998

Reid 
 This section is an excerpt from Electoral results for the Division of Reid § 1998

Richmond 
 This section is an excerpt from Electoral results for the Division of Richmond § 1998

Riverina 
 This section is an excerpt from Electoral results for the Division of Riverina § 1998

Robertson 
 This section is an excerpt from Electoral results for the Division of Robertson § 1998

Shortland 
 This section is an excerpt from Electoral results for the Division of Shortland § 1998

Sydney 
 This section is an excerpt from Electoral results for the Division of Sydney § 1998

Throsby 
 This section is an excerpt from Electoral results for the Division of Throwsby § 1998

Warringah 
 This section is an excerpt from Electoral results for the Division of Warringah § 1998

Watson 
 This section is an excerpt from Electoral results for the Division of Watson § 1998

Wentworth 
 This section is an excerpt from Electoral results for the Division of Wentworth § 1998

Werriwa 
 This section is an excerpt from Electoral results for the Division of Werriwa § 1998

See also 

 Members of the Australian House of Representatives, 1998–2001

References 

New South Wales 1998